Alexander Popp (born 4 November 1976) is a former German professional tennis player. He reached the quarterfinals of Wimbledon in 2000 and 2003.

Personal life

Popp was born in Heidelberg to parents Rainer and Jennifer, and started playing tennis at the age of 8. He was coached by Helmut Luthy, from 1994 until retirement. He holds a British passport through his mother, who was born in Wolverhampton.

Tennis career
Popp turned professional in 1997 at the age of 21.

Popp's career highlights are making the quarterfinals of Wimbledon (by far his most successful tournament) in 2000 (defeating Gustavo Kuerten and Michael Chang en route), and in 2003 (defeating Jiří Novák). He also reached the fourth round in 2004, losing to the eventual runner-up in each of these three runs (Patrick Rafter, Mark Philippoussis and Andy Roddick respectively), and the third round in 2005. Popp also reached the final of Newport in 2004 and achieved a career-high singles ranking of World No. 74.

In doubles, Popp made the final of Newport in 2002 (partnering Jürgen Melzer) and the semifinals of the Ho Chi Minh City championships in 2005 (partnering Jiří Vaněk).

ATP career finals

Singles: 1 (1 runner-up)

Doubles: 1 (1 runner-up)

ATP Challenger and ITF Futures finals

Singles: 16 (13–3)

Doubles: 2 (2–0)

Performance timeline

Singles

References

External links
 
 

1976 births
Living people
Sportspeople from Heidelberg
German male tennis players
Tennis people from Baden-Württemberg